St. Joseph's, Saskatchewan (Josephstal)  was a colony which comprised the towns of Adanac, Biggar,  Broadacres, Cactus Lake, Carmelheim, Cavell, Cosine, Denzil, Donegal, Evesham, Grosswerder, Handel, Kelfield, Kerrobert, Landis, Leipzig,  Luseland, Macklin, Major, Onward, Pascal, Phippen, Primate, Revenue, Reward, Salvador, Scott, Tramping Lake, Unity, Wilkie, and Wolfe.

References

External links
Saskatchewan, Canada, Rand McNally 1924 Indexed Pocket Map Tourists' and Shippers' Guide
GeoNames Query 
Post Offices and Postmasters - ArchiviaNet - Library and Archives Canada
Saskatchewan Gen Web - One Room School Project
Canadian Maps: January 1925 Waghorn's Guide. Post Offices in Man. Sask. Alta. and West Ontario. 

Unincorporated communities in Saskatchewan
Division No. 13, Saskatchewan